Horace Kent "Hod" Kibbie (July 18, 1903 – October 19, 1975) was an American professional baseball player. He played eleven games in Major League Baseball in 1925 for the Boston Braves, eight as a second baseman and three as a shortstop.

References

Major League Baseball infielders
Boston Braves players
Worcester Panthers players
Providence Rubes players
Fort Worth Panthers players
Texas Longhorns baseball players
Baseball players from Texas
People from Fort Worth, Texas
1903 births
1975 deaths